Hielmstierne (English: lit. Helm Star) was a Dano-Norwegian noble family.

Henrich Henrichsen (1 January 1715 – 18 July 1780) was a Danish official, historian, and collector of books. He was born in Copenhagen to Niels Henrichsen, a wealthy Icelandic merchant, and Agnete Birgitte, née Finkenhagen.

On 3 February 1747 he was ennobled under the name Hielmstierne, and on 4 August in the same year he married noblewoman Andrea Kirstine Kiærulf (19 January 1730 – 19 October 1806).

Their only daughter, Agnete Marie Hielmstierne (b. 21 July 1752), married Marcus Gerhard Rosencrone, who later was created Count of Rosencrone. They had no children.

Coat of arms
Description: On a silver shield a vertical border within which there are three six-pointed golden stars. On the helm a noble coronet, from which arise two silver bird wings between which there is a six-pointed golden star. Supporters: two onto the shield looking crowned silver eagles.

See also
 Danish nobility
 Norwegian nobility

Literature
 Jürgen Beyer, ‘Henrik Hielmstierne,’ in: Sankt Petri Kopenhagen 1575-2000. 425 Jahre Geschichte deutsch-dänischer Begegnung in Biographien, ed. Jürgen Beyer & Johannes Jensen (Copenhagen: C. A. Reitzel, 2000), pp. 45-49
 A. Thiset og P.L. Wittrup: Nyt dansk Adelslexikon, Copenhagen 1904 
 Sven Tito Achen: Danske adelsvåbener, Copenhagen 1973
 Eiler Nystrøm, Den grevelige Hielmstierne Rosencroneske Stiftelse. Et historisk Tilbageblik (Copenhagen: Gyldendal - Nordisk Forlag, 1925)
 Danish Biographical Encyclopædia: Hielmstierne, Henrik

External links 
 Hielmstierne Coat of Arms

Danish noble families
Icelandic families
Norwegian noble families